The Mayo Junior Football Championship is an annual Gaelic football competition contested by lower-tier Mayo GAA clubs.

Islandeady are the title holders (2022) defeating Cill Chomáin in the Final.

Honours
The trophy presented to the winners is the McDonnell Cup.

The winners of the Mayo Junior Championship qualify to represent their county in the Connacht Junior Club Football Championship. They often do well there, with the likes of Kilmeena (January 2022, following 2021 Mayo JFC win), Kilmaine (2019), Louisburgh (2016) and Ardnaree Sarsfields (2015) among the clubs from Mayo to win at least one Connacht Championship after winning the Mayo Junior Football Championship.

Former Mayo manager John Maughan was in charge of Lahardane when they won the 2017 Mayo JFC for the first time and then followed it up with a Connacht title, also in 2017.

The winners can, in turn, go on to play in the All-Ireland Junior Club Football Championship. In 2022, Kilmeena became the first club from Mayo to win one All-Ireland Junior Football Championship after winning the Connacht and Mayo Junior Football Championships. Previous finalists included Kiltimagh in 2010 and Ardnaree Sarsfields in 2016.

List of finals

Wins listed by club

 Crossmolina Deel Rovers (8): 1926, 1931, 1947, 1955, 1962, 1975, 2006

 Achill (7): 1942, 1965, 1983, 1991, 1995, 2007, 2014

 Islandeady (6): 1959, 1974, 1988, 1990, 2011, 2022

 Kilmeena (5): 1977, 1986, 1993, 2002, 2021

 Ardnaree (4): 1952, 1959, 1971, 2015

 Parke   (4) :1976,1981,1997,2010

 Westport (3): 1937, 1941, 1970

 Tuar Mhic Éadaigh (2): 1979, 1998

 Balla (2): 1980, 2018

 Cill Chomáin (2): 2005, 2012

 Kiltane (1): 1972

 Bonniconlon (1): 1978

 Belmullet (1): 2001

 Kiltimagh (1): 2009

 Louisburgh (1): 2016

 Lahardane (1): 2017

 Kilmaine (1): 2020

References

External links
Official Mayo Website
Mayo on Hoganstand
Mayo Club GAA

3